Erodynerus is a small Indomalayan genus of potter wasps.

References

Potter wasps